Jayco Inc., a subsidiary of Thor Industries, is an American manufacturer of recreation vehicles. The company manufactures fold-down, also called "Pop-up" Camping Trailers, Conventional Travel Trailers, Toy Haulers, Fifth-Wheel Travel Trailers, and Motorhomes (Class A, B, and C). Jayco is based in Middlebury, Indiana, and about three-quarters of its 3,200-person workforce is from the Amish and Mennonite communities of Indiana.

History
The company was founded in 1968 by Lloyd and Bertha Bontrager. Bontrager developed a trailer fold-down system in 1967 and started the business of making travel trailers in two chicken houses and a barn. In the first year of operations the company sold 132 trailers, and by the end of 1968 it had 15 employees. The company continued to grow and in 1970 built another plant in Harper, Kansas.

The company was hard hit in the energy crunch of the 1970s, and several of their plants were closed temporarily. In the late 1980s and early 1990s they also suffered another slowdown due to the high price of gasoline. The company recovered to become the second largest U.S. manufacturer of towable products by 1995.

On Easter Sunday, 1985, Lloyd Bontrager was killed when his small airplane crashed in the vicinity of Muncie, Indiana.  His wife, Bertha, became chairman of the board at Jayco, and later her sons Wilbur and Derald assumed leadership roles within the company. Currently, Derald Bontrager is president and CEO.

In addition to the Jayco brand, Jayco acquired Entegra Coach in 2008, Starcraft RV in 1991, and Highland Ridge in 2014. Jayco currently manufactures about 50,000 RVs per year, and reached the 1 millionth manufactured RV milestone in April 2016.

Jayco was acquired by Thor Industries in July 2016 for $576 million.

Models

Jayco is known for their Jay Flight model, which became available in 2001. Since 2005, the Jayco Jay Flight has been the #1 selling travel trailer brand. In 2006, the Jay Flight brand expanded its model lineup with the addition of the seasonal model, Bungalow. As part of an exclusive deal, Jay Flights began featuring tires from Goodyear with Durawall technology as standard. Jay Flight was the first to be listed as a Gold Medal Green Certified RV.

Current Model Range

Sustainability
In 2010, all of Jayco's products were green certified by TRA Certification, an accredited certification. This made Jayco the first major RV manufacturer to be 100 percent green certified and fully recognized for building products with green manufacturing processes and materials.

In 2013, Jayco Inc.'s three operating divisions, Jayco, Starcraft and Entegra Coach, recycled 1,284 tons of wood, 13,221 tons of scrap metal, and 1,801 tons of cardboard and paper, saving 59,900 mature trees.

Jayco has had a recycling program in effect since the early 1980s and has received several recognitions for its recycling efforts, including a Governor's Award of Excellence.

Awards and recognitions

 2015 RVDA Titan Award (Bertha Bontrager-Rhodes and Lloyd Bontrager) 
 Jay Flight - America's bestselling travel trailer 14 years running  
 Travel Trailer - Trailer Life 2015 Bronze Award Winner - Readers' Choice Award 
 Best of Show - New Unit by RV News (2018 Octane)
 Motorhome Silver Award Winner - Readers' Choice Award 2015 (Class C)  
 Quality Circle Awards

International

Jayco partnered with a UK-based company in the late 1970s and produced a tent camper for the European market. Jayco Australia Ltd was founded in 1975, and production commenced there the following year. Jayco of Australia soon became the largest player in the Australian camper/caravan industry.

Jayco Travel Club

Jayco developed a special travel club called "Jayco Travel Club" that has yearly vacation plans. It has over 100 chapters in the United States and Canada for their customers. The chapters are called "Flights" and often contain references to the blue jay, which is Jayco's logo and mascot.

References

External links 

 
 Jayco factory tour (4 minutes)

Recreational vehicle manufacturers
Vehicle manufacturing companies established in 1968
Manufacturing companies based in Indiana
Companies based in Elkhart County, Indiana
1968 establishments in Indiana
Caravan and travel trailer manufacturers
2016 mergers and acquisitions